Lake King William is a reservoir on the upper Derwent River in Tasmania, Australia.

Features
Lake King William is created by the Clark Dam, as part of the Upper Derwent hydro scheme.
The Cradle Mountain-Lake St Clair National Park, a component of the Tasmanian Wilderness World Heritage Area, has its boundary to the north of the lake shore.

See also

References

King William
River Derwent (Tasmania)